The Lees River or Lee's River, shown on federal maps as the Lee River, is a  tidal river that forms part of the boundary between Swansea and Somerset, Massachusetts. It flows south to drain into Mount Hope Bay.

The first documented local shipyard was established on the river between 1707 and 1712 by Samuel Lee. Today the river is designated as a Class A, "outstanding resource" water.

References 

 Southeastern Regional Planning & Economic Development District
 Environmental Protection Agency
 Massachusetts Department of Housing and Community Development

Rivers of Bristol County, Massachusetts
Rivers of Massachusetts